is a dam in Matsumoto, Nagano Prefecture, Japan, completed in 1951.

References 

Dams in Nagano Prefecture
Dams completed in 1951